The Town of Toowong is a former local government area of Queensland, Australia, located in western Brisbane in the area around the current suburb of Toowong.

History
The Toowong Division was established on 11 November 1879 under the Divisional Boards Act 1879 with a population of 1789.

In May 1880, the more populated part of Toowong Division was proclaimed the Shire of Toowong, while the remaining part of the Toowong Division was renamed Indooroopilly Division.

In 1902, the Local Authorities Act 1902 replaced all Divisions and Boroughs with Towns and Shires, creating the Town of Toowong on 31 March 1903.

On 1 October 1925, it was amalgamated into the City of Brisbane.

Leaders
The following men served as the president of the Shire of Toowong and the mayors of the Town of Toowong.

Shire presidents
 1880: William Henry Miskin
 1881–1884: Augustus Charles Gregory
 1885–1887: Robert Cribb
 1888–1890: Augustus Charles Gregory (again)
 1891–1892: George Anthony Woodstock Kibble
 1893–1894: Walter Frederick Wilson
 1895: Augustus Charles Gregory (again)
 1896: John Standring
 1897: Charles Patterson
 1898–1901: Augustus Charles Gregory (again)
 1902: Charles Frederick Siemon
 1903: Charles Patterson (again)

Town mayors
 1903: Charles Patterson (continued)
 1904: Sir Augustus Charles Gregory (again, knighted in 1903)
 1905: William Land
 1906: George Anthony Woodstock Kibble (again) 
 1907: John Francis Bergin
 1908: Charles Frederick Siemon (again)
 1909: Richard John Cottell
 1910: Thomas Biggs
 1911: William Land (again)
 1912: John Hiron
 1913: John Francis Bergin (again)
 1914: George Leslie Duff
 1915–1916: Charles Patterson (again)
 1917–1918: Alfred Henry Richer
 1919: Frederick Watts
 1920: William Henry Booth
 1921–1923: Charles Patterson (again)
 1924–1925: Archibald Watson

References

Former local government areas of Queensland
Toowong
1925 disestablishments in Australia